Callobius bennetti is a species of spider in the family Amaurobiidae. It has multiple common names: Hackled Mesh Weaver, hacklemesh weaver, night spider, and tangled nest spider. They sometimes could be mistaken for hobo spiders. The species is found in North America.

Description
Callobius bennetti has a reddish-brown cephalothorax and legs, and a grey abdomen with light markings on the dorsal surface.

References

Spiders described in 1846
Amaurobiidae
Spiders of North America